Overseas country is the designation for the overseas collectivity of French Polynesia. French Polynesia was an overseas territory until the constitutional reform on 28 March 2003 created the overseas collectivities. Then, on 27 February 2004, a law was passed giving French Polynesia the particular designation of overseas country while recalling that it belongs to the category of overseas collectivities. However, the Constitutional Council of France ruled that this description was merely a designation and not a legal status, as that would have been unconstitutional.

The territory's new status meant a certain autonomy for French Polynesia in the Pacific region. This translated into the transfer of new areas of legal responsibility (civil law, commercial law, labour law) while protecting existing autonomy in the fields of health, development and
town planning and the environment. In addition, French Polynesia gained the power to oppose the application of laws voted by the French Parliament that do not respect these areas of responsibility. Furthermore, it established French Polynesian citizenship based on permanent residency – a requirement for the right to vote in regional elections. However, France maintains control over justice, security and public order, currency, defence, and foreign policy.

See also 
 2009 Mahoran status referendum
 Administrative divisions of France
 Overseas collectivity
 Overseas department and region
 Overseas France
 Overseas Territories of France (European Parliament constituency)
 Overseas territory
 Pays (France)
 Special member state territories and the European Union

Bibliography
 Frédéric Monera, L'idée de République et la jurisprudence du Conseil constitutionnel - Paris : L.G.D.J., 2004 -;

External links
 Official website 
 Past and current developments of France's overseas administrative divisions like pays d'outre-mer